Bylice may refer to the following places:
Bylice, Greater Poland Voivodeship (west-central Poland)
Bylice, Masovian Voivodeship (east-central Poland)
Bylice, West Pomeranian Voivodeship (north-west Poland)